Nucras holubi,  Holub's sandveld lizard, is a wall lizard in the family of true lizards (Lacertidae). It is found in southern Africa, excluding the southwestern and western Cape Province, and Little and Great Namaqualand.

References 

Nucras
Lacertid lizards of Africa
Reptiles described in 1882
Taxa named by Franz Steindachner